{{Automatic taxobox
| fossil_range = Early Triassic~
| image =
| image_caption = 
| taxon = Tirolites
| authority = Mojsisovics 1879
| subdivision_ranks = Species
| subdivision_ref = 
| subdivision = Tirolites cassianusTirolites hartiTirolites haueriTirolites knightiTirolites longilobatusTirolites mangyshlakensisTirolites pealiTirolites smithiTirolites ussuriensis}}Tirolites''''' is an extinct genus of ammonites. Its first appearance defines the Smithian-Spathian boundary of the Early Triassic, and it is prominent in the Paris biota.

References 

Paleozoic molluscs
Ceratitida
Ceratitida genera